Kata is both a surname and a given name.

In Croatia, the name Kata was among the most common feminine given names until 1949.

Notable people with the name include:

Surname
 Elizabeth Kata (1912–1998), Australian writer
 Matt Kata (born 1978), Major League Baseball player

Given name
 Kata Dalström (1858–1923), Swedish socialist agitator and leftist writer
 Kata Dobó (born 1974), Hungarian actress
 Kata Pejnović (1899–1966), Croatian Serb feminist and politician

See also

Kaja (name)
 Katarina (given name)

References